Jabar Kili is a village in Bannu District of Khyber Pakhtunkhwa. It is located at 32°59'1N 70°35'19E with an altitude of 361 metres (1187 feet).

References

Populated places in Bannu District